XHEVAB-FM is a radio station in Valle de Bravo, State of México. It broadcasts on 93.5 FM and forms part of the Super Stereo Miled network covering most of the State of Mexico.

History
XEVAB-AM 1580 received its concession on September 24, 1979. The 250-watt daytimer migrated to FM in 2011.

References

Regional Mexican radio stations
Radio stations in the State of Mexico